The Moazagotl is  an orographic lenticular cloud formed by the Foehn wind on the northern (lee) side of the Riesengebirge mountains in Silesia (Poland, the Czech Republic, and Germany).  The name is thought to be derived from the name of a shepherd, Gottlieb Matz, who was known for describing them.  The Schneider Moazagotl sailplane is named for this type of cloud.  The name has sometimes been misspelled Moazagoatl, but its spelling does not include a third 'a;' the term refers to the cloud, rather than the wind that forms it.

References

Cloud types